is a Japanese adult visual novel developed by Moonstone and released on May 27, 2005, for Windows. The original game was a collaboration project where the company Circus helped to produce it, though Moonstone did the majority of the work involved. Gift is Moonstone's fourth title, and was followed up with an adult fan disc called Gift Rainbow-colored Stories released on January 27, 2006, for Windows. It was later ported to the PlayStation 2 and PlayStation Portable. The gameplay in Gift follows a plot line which offers pre-determined scenarios with courses of interaction, and focuses on the appeal of the five female main characters. The story revolves around Haruhiko Amami, a male high school student living in a town where a rainbow is always seen in the sky.

The game premiered as the second best-selling PC game sold in Japan for the time of its release, and charted in the national top 50 three more times afterwards. A set of five drama CDs, one for each heroine, was released by Lantis between September 2005 and February 2006. There have been six light novels written, a five-chapter illustrated story series that serialized in the Dengeki Hime magazine, two Internet radio shows produced, along with a manga series serialized in Kadokawa Shoten's seinen magazine Comptiq between January 2006 and February 2007. A 12-episode anime adaptation, produced by Oriental Light and Magic, aired in Japan between October and December 2006.

Gameplay
The gameplay requires little interaction from the player as most of the duration of the game is spent on simply reading the text that will appear on the screen; this text represents either dialogue between the various characters, or the inner thoughts of the protagonist. Every so often, the player will come to a "decision point" where he or she is given the chance to choose from options that are displayed on the screen, typically two to three at a time. During these times, gameplay pauses until a choice is made that furthers the plot in a specific direction, depending on which choice the player makes.

There are five main plot lines that the player will have the chance to experience, one for each of the heroines in the story. In order to view the five plot lines to their entirety, the player will have to replay the game multiple times and choose different choices during the decision points in order to further the plot in an alternate direction.

Plot
Gift is a story that revolves around high school student Haruhiko Amami and his strong connection to Gift's mysterious power. The town of Narasakicho, where Gift'''s story takes place, has two distinguishing characteristics: a rainbow that seems permanently fixed in the sky no matter the weather, and an ability known as Gift possessed by all its inhabitants. Gift's power can only be evoked by each person once in a lifetime, and is able to grant a single miracle. To be successful, a Gift must reflect the shared feelings of both the giver and the receiver. If the feelings are not mutual, the Gift is distorted and has the ability to wreak havoc on the surrounding area. When this happens, a black streak appears in the rainbow above town until Gift is used correctly. The story begins as Haruhiko's younger sister, Riko Fukimine, returns home after several years away. Beginning with her appearance, Haruhiko's life starts to change very quickly and feelings of the past begin to surface once more.

Characters

Main characters

 (PC), Yūki Tai (PS2/anime)
Haruhiko, a second-year student at Shimano Gakuen, is the main protagonist of Gift. He is a childhood friend of Kirino and the older brother of Riko, though they are not related by blood. He tends to be blunt in his mannerisms and likes to tease Kirino constantly. Whenever Gift is concerned, he is adamant that it is a helpful and worthwhile power to possess, for he claims that he owes his own life to it. His mother died many years ago, soon after his birth. It was then revealed that Gift was in fact created on the same day he was born by his mother Haru Amami before she died. But because Gift can only be sent or received once in a person's lifetime, in order for both Riko and Kirino's Gift be removed, he has to remove the source Gift itself which is embodied by the everlasting rainbow in the sky. But as a result, he also lost his life for a while before Riko found him.

 (PC), Ai Shimizu (PS2/anime)
Riko is Haruhiko's younger sister in name, although they are the same age and are in the same class together in school after she enrolls. In third grade, she joined Haruhiko's family due to family circumstances and Haruhiko immediately treated her as if she really were his little sister. When they were younger, she left for several years, only to appear again one day out of the blue years later. The reason she returned was to be with Haruhiko as he is her first love and has continued to be in love with him. She is currently a second-year at Shimano Gakuen and shares the same class as Haruhiko.

 (PC), Ui Miyazaki (PS2/anime)
Kirino is Haruhiko's childhood friend and next door neighbor. They are such good friends that she often comes over to his house in the mornings before school to not only wake him up, but also to make him breakfast. She tends to be the unfortunate receiver of much of Haruhiko's teasing due to her timid nature, though she does not mind it much, as she is in love with Haruhiko. She is one year younger than Haruhiko and is a first-year student at Shimano Gakuen.

 (PC), Shiho Kawaragi (PS2/anime)
Rinka is a very tough but beautiful girl who is able to defend herself without even breaking a sweat. She is a master at the Ousō style of swordsmanship and was even a teacher of the kendo club in junior high school. She has a series of special training devices near the gym which are dangerous to nearly anyone except for her. She has an older sister who has died years ago. Unknown to most people, she has a liking for Shoujo Manga. She is a first-year student at Shimano Gakuen.

 (PC), Ryoko Shintani (PS2/anime)
Chisa is Kirino's best friend. Her father is the founder of Fujimiya Corporation so she is considered a businessman's daughter and raised as a princess. She is on good terms with Rinka. Unknown to everyone, though, she is in fact a witch that often flies around town on her broomstick. She has a small crow familiar named Jinta. She seems to be able to respond to Haruhiko's banter about things very well. She is a first-year student at Shimano Gakuen and is Kirino's classmate.

 (PC), Ami Koshimizu (PS2/anime)
Yukari, or "Yukarin" as she is known by her friends, is a third-year student at Shimano Gakuen, and she also works as a maid at the Fujimiya Residence. She acts older than her age and is skilled at treating injuries. She tends to speak with a quiet voice. Her reason that she works there is that she has lost a portion of her past memories, and seems to have an innate ability to talk to animals. Her always likes is to cheer for others in life by saying: "Please do your best."

 (PC), Kazutoshi Hatano (PS2/anime)
Masaki, known as Maki to his friends, is one of Haruhiko's good friends who is obsessed with things having to do with science. He will often invent outrageous devices that eventually go out of control.

 (PC), Yukiko Iwai (PS2/anime)
Nami is a girl who has been seen clinging to Rinka ever since Rinka saved her in the past. She is very enthusiastic when it comes to anything concerning Rinka, which often causes her to rave about how amazing Rinka is. She has shown herself to be jealous of others who may seem to be more than just friends with Rinka, which could be because she is in love with her.

Gift: Prism additional characters

 (PS2/anime)
Sena is a second-year student in Shimano Gakuen and also is the head of the School's Student Council, who is recommended by the former head. She is the official Idol of Shimano Gakuen whose popularity is comparable to that of Riko's. Sena has a liking for penguins and is obsessed with getting as many of those toys as possible. She is able to collect Gift from every male student in Shimano Gakuen who confesses his feelings to her, but she doesn't go out with any of those guys even once. In addition, this Gift to her is easily obtainable, but it doesn't make her happy even if she has that ability.

 (PS2/anime)
Nene is a third-year student in Shimano Gakuen and is a daughter of a wealthy man whose financial ability far exceeds that of the Fujimiya Household. Although she is popular with the first and second-year students in the school, many classmates dislike her for her extremely high-handed nature due to her upbringing. This results in her having no one to call a friend in school. Her father is a successful IT entrepreneur while her mother is a famous celebrity making Nene a real society princess. But she has a bad habit of carrying only credit cards of all sorts and no cash which makes buying in school canteens very difficult. She always replies to anyone who tries to confess their feelings to her: "Call my lawyers first!"

 (PS2/anime)
Miyu is a second-year student in Shimano Gakuen who is a quiet girl and always carry a book with her. She has a collie dog and seems to always peeping at Haruhiko from the shadows after he has helped her before. Both her parents have died and Miyu herself has been living on royalties paid to her mother's literary works which are mainly romance novels and thus also affected her ambition to become a novelist. She belongs to the literary club at school and loves reading. She is also actively writing stories and posts the works onto her own website.

Development and release
Koizumi Hotaru managed the production of Gift, and Lantis, a Japanese company that specializes in the music industry, also cooperated with production. Characters in the game were designed by the following; Mitha, Koma Miyama, and Misuzu Takano. Gifts art was illustrated by Amerika Tamugi, Yuu Touka, and Karuya Yuka, with the addition of character designers Mitha, Koma, and Misuzu. Shigezo Tsuchiyama handled the programming for Gift, and Kure worked as the scenario planner.

Gift was first introduced to the public in Japan as a limited edition version on May 27, 2005 as a DVD playable on a Microsoft Windows PC. The regular edition was released on June 10, 2005, also as a DVD, and then another version was released on December 16, 2005 as a CD-ROM. A fandisc called  was released on January 27, 2006 as a CD-ROM. A version for the PlayStation 2 (PS2) with adult content removed, called Gift: Prism, was developed by Sweets and released in Japan on October 19, 2006 in limited and regular editions. This PS2 version has added CGs to replace the adult scenes and also has added three additional heroines that the protagonist can pursue in addition to the original five. The PS2 game was re-released on August 9, 2007 at a lower price. An iOS edition of the PS2 version was released on April 16, 2009. A PlayStation Portable version by CyberFront was released on February 2, 2012.

Adaptations

Print media
A five-part illustrated story series was serialized in MediaWorks' Dengeki Hime magazine between the February and June 2005 issues. Each issue focused on a different Gift heroine. A light novel series based on the game comprising five volumes was published by Harvest. Each of the novels covers one of the five heroines starting with Riko, and going through with Kirino, Rinka, Chisa, and Yukari, in that order. The first novel was released on December 25, 2005, and the final novel was released on May 1, 2006. The novels were written by Japanese author Mako Komao, with accompanied illustrations provided by Mugi Komeda, Mitha, Koma Miyama, and Mamoru Naruse. A separate light novel called Gift Prism: Over the Rainbow was written by Hiroshi Sukeno; the novel's front illustration was by Mitha, and Yukiwo worked as the main illustrator. It was published by Kadokawa Shoten on November 7, 2006.

Gift'''s manga adaptation, illustrated by Yukiwo and titled Gift: Under the Rainbow, was serialized in Kadokawa's seinen Comptiq magazine between January 10, 2006 and February 10, 2007. Two tankōbon volumes were released for the 13 chapters produced. Two art books based on Gift have been published. The first of these was a 39-page long fan book titled Gift First Fan Book, which was published by Broccoli in May 2005. A 111-page art book, titled Gift Artworks was published by MediaWorks on August 1, 2006.

Audio CDs and radio shows
A vocal mini album was released by Lantis for the visual novel Gift on July 7, 2005, containing eight tracks. Lantis released an original soundtrack for Gift fan disc Gift Rainbow-colored Stories on January 12, 2006, titled Gift - Niji-Iro Stories 'Seven Color Ribbon, containing 25 tracks. Two albums from the anime were published by Lantis. The first of these is Gift ~eternal rainbow~ Character Song Mini Album, which comprises five different character songs for each of the heroines. An original soundtrack for the anime was released on January 24, 2007, containing 38 tracks.

There are five drama CDs based on the series published by Lantis. Each of the CDs covers one of the five heroines starting with Riko, and going through with Kirino, Chisa, Rinka, and Yukari, in that order. The first CD was released on September 22, 2005, and the final CD was released on February 22, 2006.

Lantis Net Radio has hosted two Gift-related shows: Gift Rainbow Station (aired from October 11, 2005, to May 23, 2006), and Gift Rainbow Homeroom (aired from July 14 to December 29, 2006). The two radio shows feature different on-air personalities.

Anime
A 12-episode anime television series adaptation, titled , was produced by  Oriental Light and Magic and directed by Shigeru Kimiya. It aired in Japan between October 6 and December 22, 2006. The opening theme is "Niji Iro Sentimental" by Miyuki Hashimoto and the ending theme is  "Kokoro Niji o Kakete" by Misato Fujiya. Six DVD compilations volumes were released between December 22, 2006 and May 25, 2007, each volume containing two episodes. An extra episode was released as a DVD-exclusive original video animation on June 22, 2007.

Episodes

Reception
According to a national sales ranking of bishōjo games sold in Japan, the PC release of Gift premiered at No. 2 during the second half of May 2005. Gift charted further in the rankings, ranking No. 9 in the first half of June, No. 34 in the second half, and lastly, No. 44 in the first half of July. On Getchu.com, a major redistributor of visual novel and domestic anime products, Gift ranked No. 2 in PC sales in Japan for May 2005, the month and year of its release, only falling behind the visual novel Princess Witches, which ranked first. In the following month June, the ranking fell to No. 11. In the entirety of 2005 on Getchu.com, Gift ranked No. 32. The fan disc Gift Rainbow-colored Stories, ranked first in January 2006, the month and year of its release, on Getchu.com. In the following month, the ranking fell to No. 13. For the first half of 2006, Gift Rainbow-colored Stories ranked No. 12 on Getchu.com.

References

External links
Gift visual novel official website 
Gift PlayStation 2 official website 
Lantis Net Radio's Gift website 
Anime official website 

2005 Japanese novels
2005 video games
2006 anime television series debuts
2006 Japanese novels
2006 manga
2006 video games
2007 anime OVAs
Anime television series based on video games
Bishōjo games
Drama anime and manga
Eroge
Fantasy anime and manga
Fantasy video games
Harem anime and manga
IOS games
Japan-exclusive video games
Kadokawa Shoten manga
Lantis (company)
Light novels
Manga based on video games
OLM, Inc.
OVAs based on video games
PlayStation 2 games
PlayStation Portable games
Romance anime and manga
Romance video games
Seinen manga
Video games developed in Japan
Visual novels
Windows games
CyberFront games
Moonstone (company) games